KAJL-LD, virtual and UHF digital channel 16, is a low-powered Telemundo-affiliated television station licensed to Fayetteville, Arkansas, United States, serving mainly the northern half of the Fort Smith-Fayetteville-Rogers market of western Arkansas. The station is owned and operated by DTV America Corporation, a southern Florida-based group of television stations that is launching stations in 70 markets throughout the mid-2010s. Its transmitter is located on Robinson Mountain in eastern Washington County along Ed Edwards Road.

History 
The station's application history dates back to around February 2011 under the call letters K18JL-D. The callsigns were changed to the current KAJL-LD in 2013.

DTV America Corporation announced in December 2013 that KAJL will go on the air as a Telemundo affiliate, doing so by early 2014. The station is the newest competitor to two other Spanish television stations in the market, Univision affiliates KXUN-LD and KWNL-CD and Telemundo affiliate KEGW-CD.

Doctor TV, a new healthy-lifestyle oriented network was run on channel 16.2 until December 2015, when it was replaced by the Grit TV network. On that same day, KAJL-LD3 began broadcasting Sony Pictures Television's GetTV, and KAJL-LD4 was launched to serve as a Laff network affiliate.

Digital television

Digital channels
The station's signal is multiplexed:

References

External links
KAJL-LD FAYETTEVILLE, AR Query on RabbitEars.info
Query the FCC’s TV station database for KAJL
DTV America 
DTV America search results @ RabbitEars.Info

 

Stadium (sports network) affiliates
GetTV affiliates
Buzzr affiliates
Movies! affiliates
AJL-LD
Low-power television stations in the United States
Innovate Corp.